Ramsar County is in Mazandaran province, Iran. The capital of the county is the city of Ramsar. At the 2006 census, the county's population was 67,675 in 19,666 households. The following census in 2011 counted 68,323 people in 21,889 households. At the 2016 census, the county's population was 74,179 in 25,312 households.

Administrative divisions

The population history of Ramsar County's administrative divisions over three consecutive censuses is shown in the following table. The latest census shows one district, four rural districts, and two cities.

References

 

Counties of Mazandaran Province